Jesse Ricks was an American lawyer and businessman who served as the former president and board Chairman of the Union Carbide and Carbon Company.

Biography and career 
Ricks was the president, chairman, and director of the Union Carbide and Carbon Company, and served as a lawyer with the firm of Winston & Meagher. He also served as Union Carbide's general counsel.

In 1903, Ricks joined the law firm of Winston & Meagher. After joining the firm, its name eventually became Meagher, Whitney, Ricks, & Sullivan.

In 1941, Ricks went from being President of Union Carbide to its chairman. He was replaced by Benjamin O'Shea.

Death 
Ricks died on the morning of Sunday, February 20, 1944, in his Long Island estate.

Personal life 
Ricks lived in his estate, Chanticlare, in Flower Hill, New York. He was married to Sybil Ricks (born Hayward). The couple had four children: Jesse Jr., John, Jane, and James.

References 

Flower Hill, New York
Business executives

19th-century births
1944 deaths

Year of birth missing